The 1997 Grambling State Tigers football team represented Grambling State University as a member of the Southwestern Athletic Conference (SWAC) during the 1997 NCAA Division I-AA football season. The Tigers were led by head coach Eddie Robinson in his 55th year and finished the season with a record of three wins and eight losses (3–8, 2–5 SWAC). The Tigers offense scored 187 points while the defense allowed 258 points.

This was Eddie Robinson's final season as head coach. Robinson spent fifty-six years as the head coach at historically black Grambling State University in Grambling in Lincoln Parish in northern Louisiana, from 1941 through 1997.

Schedule

Reference:

Team players in the NFL
None of the players from the Tigers were drafted in the 1998 NFL Draft.

Notes

References

Grambling State
Grambling State Tigers football seasons
Grambling State Tigers football